The Vysshaya Liga (Supreme League of the Russian Ice Hockey Championship), also referred as Higher League or Major League and commonly abbreviated as RUS-2, was a second level professional ice hockey league in Russia.

Season structure
The league consisted of two divisions (East and West) before 2008 and three divisions for the last two seasons. During 1997–2000 there was a relegation round where the strongest teams of the league played with the weakest RSL clubs for their place in the top division. In 2001–01 this system was replaced with a final round between the league teams only and starting with 2003–04 the Supreme League ultimately switched to playoffs. Its finalists were promoted to the RSL.

In 2008, when the Superleague became defunct, the Supreme League that still was operating under the FHR authority got its own cup.

Champions
 1992–93 – CSK VVS Samara
 1993–94 – CSK VVS Samara
 1994–95 – Neftekhimik Nizhnekamsk
 1995–96 – Amur Khabarovsk
 1996–97 – (West) CSKA Moscow / (East) HC Mechel
 1997–98 – (West) HC Lipetsk / (East) Neftyanik Almetyevsk
 1998–99 – Torpedo Nizhny Novgorod
 1999–00 – Neftyanik Almetyevsk
 2000–01 – Spartak Moscow
 2001–02 – Sibir Novosibirsk
 2002–03 – Torpedo Nizhny Novgorod
 2003–04 – Molot-Prikamye Perm
 2004–05 – HC MVD
 2005–06 – Traktor Chelyabinsk
 2006–07 – Torpedo Nizhny Novgorod
 2007–08 – Khimik Voskresensk
 2008–09 – Yugra Khanty-Mansiysk
 2009–10 – Yugra Khanty-Mansiysk

Establishment of the VHL

In 2010, it became known that the Vysshaya Liga was to be replaced with the KHL–affiliated Higher Hockey League (VHL) under a new ownership. Most of the Vysshaya Liga clubs re-signed with the new league in the summer of 2010.

In 2010, the Supreme Hockey League was also established.

External links
Official Page
League schedule and standings

Sports leagues established in 1992
Sports leagues disestablished in 2010
Defunct ice hockey leagues in Russia
1992 establishments in Russia
2010 disestablishments in Russia
Russian Major League

it:Vysšaja Hokkejnaja Liga